Zani Barnard (born 15 March 1999) is an inactive South African tennis player. She played for South Africa on the Fed Cup in 2019.

Barnard has a career-high ITF juniors ranking of 73, achieved on 29 February 2016.

She started studying at Middle Tennessee State University (MTSU), in 2017 with her twin sister Lee.

ITF Circuit finals

Doubles (0–1)

ITF Junior Circuit finals

Singles (2–9)

Doubles (7–5)

National representation

Fed Cup
Barnard made her Fed Cup debut for South Africa in 2019, while the team was competing in the Europe/Africa Zone Group II, when she was 19 years and 330 days old.

Fed Cup (0–1)

Singles (0–1)

References

External links
 
 
 

1999 births
Living people
South African female tennis players
College women's tennis players in the United States
Twin sportspeople
South African twins
Middle Tennessee Blue Raiders women's tennis players
People from Witbank
White South African people